Kulashi is a small town (daba) in Imereti, Georgia with the population of around 1,702 as of 2014. It is located 5 km from the town of Samtredia. It first appears in the 16th century records as a fief of the Mikeladze family. It was granted the status of daba in 1961.

Kulashi had formerly been a home to one of the largest Georgian Jewish community, whose size has significantly decreased due to several waves of Jewish expatriation to Israel. As such, it had sometimes been referred to as the "Jerusalem of Georgia". Among the prominent Jews who came from Kulashi are Ephraim Gur and businessman .

See also
 Imereti

References 

Cities and towns in Imereti
Populated places in Samtredia Municipality